16th SDFCS Awards
December 14, 2011

Best Film: 
The Artist

Best Director: 
Nicolas Winding Refn
Drive
The 16th San Diego Film Critics Society Awards were announced on December 14, 2011.

Winners and nominees

Best Actor
Michael Shannon – Take Shelter as Curtis LaForcheGeorge Clooney – The Descendants as Matt King
Jean Dujardin – The Artist as George Valentin
Brendan Gleeson – The Guard as Gerry Boyle
Brad Pitt – Moneyball as Billy Bean

Best ActressBrit Marling – Another Earth as Rhoda WilliamsViola Davis – The Help as Aibileen Clarke
Elizabeth Olsen – Martha Marcy May Marlene as Martha
Tilda Swinton – We Need to Talk About Kevin as Eve Khatchadourian
Michelle Williams – My Week with Marilyn as Marilyn Monroe

Best Animated FilmArthur Christmas
Happy Feet Two
Kung Fu Panda 2
Rango
Winnie the Pooh

Best Cinematography
The Tree of Life – Emmanuel Lubezki
The Artist – Guillaume Schiffman
Drive – Newton Thomas Sigel
Hugo – Robert Richardson
Take Shelter – Adam Stone

Best Director
Nicolas Winding Refn – Drive
Woody Allen – Midnight in Paris
Michel Hazanavicius – The Artist
Terrence Malick – The Tree of Life
Martin Scorsese – Hugo

Best Documentary
Project Nim
Buck
Cave of Forgotten Dreams
Into the Abyss
Page One: Inside the New York Times

Best Editing
Beginners – Olivier Bugge Coutté
The Artist – Anne-Sophie Bion and Michel Hazanavicius
Drive – Mat Newman
Hugo – Thelma Schoonmaker
The Tree of Life – Hank Corwin, Jay Rabinowitz, Daniel Rezende, Billy Weber and Mark Yoshikawa

Best Ensemble Performance
Harry Potter and the Deathly Hallows – Part 2CarnageThe HelpMargin CallMidnight in ParisBest FilmThe Artist
Drive
Hugo
Midnight in Paris
The Tree of Life

Best Foreign Language Film
Le Quattro Volte • Italy
The Double Hour (La doppia ora) • Italy
Happy, Happy (Sykt lykkelig) • Norway
Of Gods and Men (Des hommes et des dieux) • France
A Somewhat Gentle Man (En ganske snill mann) • Norway

Best Production Design
Hugo – Dante Ferretti
The Artist – Laurence Bennett
Harry Potter and the Deathly Hallows – Part 2 – Stuart Craig
Midnight in Paris – Anne Seibel
The Tree of Life – Jack Fisk

Best Score
Harry Potter and the Deathly Hallows – Part 2 – Alexandre Desplat
The Artist – Ludovic Bource
Extremely Loud and Incredibly Close – Alexandre Desplat
Hugo – Howard Shore
The Tree of Life – Alexandre Desplat

Best Original Screenplay
Midnight in Paris – Woody Allen
50/50 – Will Reiser
The Artist – Michel Hazanavicius
Beginners – Mike Mills
Win Win – Tom McCarthy

Best Adapted Screenplay
Moneyball – Steve Zaillian and Aaron Sorkin
The Descendants – Alexander Payne, Nat Faxon and Jim Rash
Drive – Hossein Amini
Harry Potter and the Deathly Hallows – Part 2 – Steve Kloves
Hugo – John Logan

Best Supporting Actor
Nick Nolte – Warrior as Paddy Conlon
Albert Brooks – Drive as Bernie Rose
Christopher Plummer – Beginners as Hal Fields
Andy Serkis – Rise of the Planet of the Apes as Caesar
Max von Sydow – Extremely Loud and Incredibly Close as The Renter

Best Supporting Actress
Shailene Woodley – The Descendants as Alexandra King
Bérénice Bejo – The Artist as Peppy Miller
Jessica Chastain – The Help as Celia Foote
Mélanie Laurent – Beginners as Anna
Carey Mulligan – Shame as Sissy Sullivan

Body of Work
Jessica Chastain

References
San Diego Film Critics Award The Artist Best Picture, Refn Best Director AwardsDaily

2
2011 film awards
2011 in American cinema